The Rev. Donald Macdonald (1825–20 August 1901) was one of two ministers in the founding Presbytery of the Free Presbyterian Church of Scotland, which separated in 1893 from the Free Church of Scotland (1843–1900) as the result of a Protest at the meeting of the General Assembly of the Free Church on 25 May 1893 by the Rev. Donald Macfarlane against the Declaratory Act passed by the General Assembly in 1892 modifying the church's adherence to the Westminster Confession of Faith, believing that it thereby 'altered and vitiated' the constitution of the Free Church in law.

Macdonald was born at Langash in the parish of North Uist in 1825.  He became the Free Church of Scotland minister in Shieldaig in 1872 but he was evicted from his church and manse in 1893.  His biographer wrote: “The Assembly of 1877 presented them [the minister and his congregation] with church and manse in consideration of their faithful adherence to the principles of the Free Church; the Assembly of 1893 deprived them of these gifts for the very same reason!”
After worshipping in the open air a new church was opened in 1895 for the newly formed Shieldaig congregation of the Free Presbyterian Church of Scotland and a new manse completed in 1897.

He died on 20 August 1901 in his manse at Shieldaig and was buried in Applecross cemetery, followed by his wife Mary who died on 17 August 1909.

Works and Publications
 Creation and the Fall; A Defence and Exposition of the First Three Chapters of Genesis (1856)

References 

Ministers of the Free Presbyterian Church of Scotland
1825 births
1901 deaths
19th-century Ministers of the Free Church of Scotland